Ninja Warrior UK (also known as Ninja Warrior UK: Race for Glory) is a British physical obstacle assault course game show, created for ITV. The show is based upon the format of the Japanese game show Sasuke, created by Ushio Higuchi, which is aired in the United Kingdom and other countries as Ninja Warrior.

Presented by Ben Shephard, Chris Kamara and Rochelle Humes, the show focuses on around 250 contestants (160 in series 4–5) tackling a difficult assault course featuring a variety of obstacles, the most notable being the Warped Wall. Contestants advance in the competition by achieving a fast enough time or progressing far enough along the course. The competition culminates with a final, in which the contestant who goes furthest fastest is declared "Last Ninja Standing". If a competitor completes the final obstacle, Mt Midoriyama, in under 45 seconds, they will be declared winner of the contest and crowned "Ninja Warrior UK". 

Dubbed the "Toughest course on TV", the show originally aired five series between 2015 and 2019, including one celebrity special episode aired as part of the Text Santa telethon on 18 December 2015. The first competitor to complete the entire course was Tim Champion, beating Mt Midoriyama in the fifth series. After a three-year hiatus, the show returned in September 2022, this time under the name Ninja Warrior UK: Race for Glory, which featured contestants racing against each other. Beth Lodge and Fred Dorrington are the most recent champions, beating Midoriyama in the sixth series (Race for Glory).

Format
In the show's original run, the competition was divided into three main stages - the heats, the semi-finals and the final. Despite the show being based upon Sasuke, the assault course used on the programme featured obstacles primarily from American Ninja Warrior.

In the Heats, competitors would attempt a six obstacle course, starting with the "Quintuple Steps" in series 1–3 or the "Floating Steps" in series 4–5 and always culminating with the "Warped Wall". The other four featured obstacles would vary between the individual heat episodes. In series 1-3, 50 competitors took part in one of five heats, with the top 10 advancing to the semi-finals. In series 4–5, the number of heat episodes was reduced to four, with the top 15 advancing in series 4 and only those who beat the wall advancing in series 5.

After the qualifiers, the remaining competitors would be split evenly between two semi-finals, and tackle a nine obstacle course. Unlike the qualifiers, the first six obstacles must be completed within a set time-limit, but competitors can then freely tackle the remaining three obstacles in their own time. The top 15 competitors across both semi-finals would move on to the final, based on who got the furthest or achieved the fastest time. In series 4, due to a larger number of semi-finalists, the top 30 competitors would advance to the finals. In series 5, this number was reduced to 20.

Once in the final, the finalists tackle four separate stages of obstacles. They must complete the entire course to advance to the next stage. In Stage 1, competitors attempt a nine obstacle course with a strict time limit. From series 4, Stage 1 was rebranded to the "Eliminator" and aired in a separate episode to Stages 2 onwards. Stage 2 is also timed and the remaining contestants attempt five obstacles. Stage 3 is an untimed three obstacle course, following on directly from Stage 2, and consists of three obstacles. In recent years, these obstacles have varied very little and include the Crazy Cliffhanger, Spider Flip and Flying Bar. The final stage of the finals is a 22 meter rope climb, on (fictional) "Mount Midoriyama", which must be completed in under 45 seconds. Should a competitor complete this, they have then achieved total victory and are declared "Ninja Warrior UK". In the event that no competitor completes the finals course, the competitor who goes furthest along the course in the fastest time is declared "Last Ninja Standing".

The show's format features a similar approach to that of Total Wipeout, in that footage in episodes focuses on the highlights of runs by contestants. Commentary of a contestant's run is mainly done by Shephard and Kamara, while Humes would often interview contestants before their run, and occasionally if they failed a run; in some instances, if a contestant's run was successful, especially during the qualifiers, the interview would be handled by Shephard and Kamara.

Series overview

Series 1 (2015)

The first series of Ninja Warrior UK aired during 2015, from 11 April to 30 May. Of the 14 contestants that made it to the final, 6 completed Stage 1 but none managed to complete Stage 2. As a result, the winner was declared as Timothy Shieff, who managed to go the furthest. The series drew favourable viewing figures, leading ITV to renew the show for a second series on 29 May 2015.

Series 2 (2016)

The second series of Ninja Warrior UK aired during 2016, from 2 January to 13 February. Of the 15 contestants that made it to the final, only three finalists made it to the second stage before failing on the same obstacle. Of these three, Owen McKenzie was declared the "Last Ninja Standing", having managed to go the furthest.

Series 3 (2017)

The third series of Ninja Warrior UK aired from 31 December 2016 to 18 February 2017. Of the 15 contestants that made it to the final, six completed Stage 1 and only two completed Stage 2 before failing on the Crazy Cliffhanger in Stage 3. Of these two, Jonny Urzuly was declared the "Last Ninja Standing", having gone the furthest on the obstacle.

Series 4 (2018)

The fourth series of Ninja Warrior UK aired from 14 April to 2 June 2018. Unlike previous series, it was announced on 28 August 2017 that the competition would feature a selection of celebrity contestants, including Gethin Jones, Harry Judd, Jenni Falconer and Marvin Humes. Of the 30 finalists, 8 completed Stage 1, 5 completed Stage 2 and none completed Stage 3. Tim Shieff was declared "Last Ninja Standing", failing the Flying Bar.

Series 5 (2019)

The fifth series of Ninja Warrior UK aired from 13 April to 1 June 2019. Of the 20 finalists, 15 completed Stage 1, 8 completed Stage 2 and 1 completed Stages 3 and 4. The winner was Tim Champion, who became the first UK competitor to attempt and complete the Mount Midoriyama rope climb within 45 seconds, doing so with just 1 second to spare. This was the show's final series before its three-year hiatus.

Series 6 (2022)

On 11 August 2020, Kamara revealed that ITV had no plans to commission a new series, thus marking the end of the series. Despite this however, it was announced in February 2022, that the show would return later that year for a sixth series.

The sixth series, known as Ninja Warrior UK: Race for Glory, was filmed in August 2022 at Manchester Central, and began airing on 10 September 2022. The format was changed to introduce knockout head-to-head races, with contestants facing off against each other and a team of professional course testers in a knockout-style competition.

Celebrity special
On 18 December 2015, a special celebrity edition of Ninja Warrior UK was aired in association with the Text Santa charity. The celebrities competed on a six obstacle course, culminating with the Warped Wall; the winner was Louise Hazel.

Since 2018, celebrities have competed as part of the regular competition in the heats.

Ratings

Adventure Parks

Several indoor adventure parks using the Ninja Warrior UK branding have opened in cities across the UK, featuring obstacle courses inspired by the TV show.

References

External links

 
UK
English-language television shows